The Department of Justice was formed when the Ministry of Justice, National Cohesion and Constitutional Affairs of the Republic of Kenya was dissolved around 2007. It is the Kenyan government ministry responsible for Legal Policy, Policy on Administration of Justice and  Constitutional Matters.

List of ministers
See Minister of Justice (Kenya)

List of attorneys general
See Attorney General of Kenya

See also

 Justice ministry

Kenya
Heads of State of Kenya
Heads of Government of Kenya
Vice-Presidents of Kenya
Colonial Heads of Kenya

References

External links
 Ministry of Justice, Kenya

Kenya
Ministries established in 1963